Three hundred and forty-four scholars and artists were awarded a total of $1,500,000 Guggenheim Fellowships in 1957.

1957 U. S. and Canadian Fellows

1957 Latin American and Caribbean Fellows

See also
 Guggenheim Fellowship
 List of Guggenheim Fellowships awarded in 1956
 List of Guggenheim Fellowships awarded in 1958

References

1957
1957 awards